Bhandara is a genus of leafhoppers, found in Southeast Asia. The genus was first identified by English entomologist, William Lucas Distant, in 1908.

Species
Known species include:
 Bhandara arta (Young, 1986)
 Bhandara diaphana (Traschenberg, 1884)
 Bhandara habethana (Young, 1986)
 Bhandara horsfieldi (Distant, 1908)
 Bhandara opacipennis (Young, 1986)
 Bhandara pavo (Signoret, 1853)
 Bhandara semiclara (Signoret, 1853)
 Bhandara semiviterea (Walker, 1858)
 Bhandara stellata (Signoret, 1853)
 Bhandara suavissima (Walker, 1857)
 Bhandara translucida (Young, 1986)

References 

Hemiptera of Asia
Cicadellidae genera
Cicadellini
Insects described in 1908